The Dartmouth Big Green baseball team is the varsity intercollegiate baseball program of Dartmouth College, located in Hanover, New Hampshire. It has been a member of the NCAA Division I Ivy League baseball conference since its founding at the start of the 1993 season. Before that it was a member of the Eastern Intercollegiate Baseball League (EIBL). Its home venue is Red Rolfe Field at Biondi Park, located on the university's campus. Bob Whalen has been the program's head coach since the start of the 1990 season. The program has appeared in seven NCAA Tournaments and one College World Series. In conference postseason play, it has been EIBL Champion twelve times and has appeared in the Ivy League Baseball Championship Series 11 times, winning twice. 30 former Big Green have appeared in Major League Baseball.

Coaches

Head coaches

Notable alumni
Brad Ausmus – catcher in Major League Baseball; attended, but did not play baseball for Dartmouth
Jim Beattie - pitcher for New York Yankees and Seattle Mariners
Kyle Hendricks – pitcher in Major League Baseball for Chicago Cubs
Ed Lucas – third baseman in Major League Baseball
Mike Remlinger – pitcher in Major League Baseball
Red Rolfe - major league third baseman and four-time All Star for New York Yankees
Chuck Seelbach - MLB Pitcher for Detroit Tigers
Cole Sulser - MLB Pitcher for Baltimore Orioles
Ben Rice - minor league catcher for New York Yankees

References

 
1866 establishments in New Hampshire